Hilja Haapala, (Hilja Dagmar Janhonen)  (14 January 1877 in Jyväskylä – 26 August 1958 in Jyväskylä) was a Finnish writer.

Books under name of Hilja Janhonen
 Ristiriitoja. Oulu 1936
 Panettelu on käärme. Oulu 1956
 Lapsipuolen asemassa. Oulu 1958

Books under name of Hilja Haapala
 Isien tähden: romaani vuosisadanvaihteen Suomesta. Oulu 1925, 2nd ed. Marjamaa, Oulu 1949
 Koivulan häpäisijä: romaani vuosisadanvaihteen Suomesta. H. W. Marjamaan Publ., Oulu 1925, 2nd 1927, 3rd ed. Marjamaa & kumpp., Oulu 1948
 Tummanpunainen ruusu 1. H. W. Marjamaan Publ., Oulu 1926, 2nd ed. under title Tummanpunainen ruusu, Marjamaa, Oulu 1951
 Tummanpunainen ruusu 2: Hallovan Inkeri-rouva. H. W. Marjamaan Publ., Oulu 1926, 2nd ed. under title Hallovan Inkeri-rouva, Marjamaa, Oulu 1952
 Sovitus. H. W. Marjamaan Publ., Oulu 1928
 Tahrattu morsiuskruunu Marjamaa, Oulu 1930, 2nd ed. 1952
 "Viettelijä. Marjamaa, Oulu 1930
 Suojelusenkelini. Marjamaa, Oulu 1949
 Äidin perintö Marjamaa, Oulu 1956
 Miksi hän joi?''. Finnish Republican Printing Co, Calumet, Michigan

References

1877 births
1958 deaths
Finnish women novelists
20th-century Finnish women writers
20th-century Finnish writers
People from Jyväskylä